Macrauzata is a genus of moths belonging to the subfamily Drepaninae.

Species
Macrauzata fenestraria (Moore, [1868])
Macrauzata maxima Inoue, 1960
Macrauzata melanapex Inoue, 1993
Macrauzata minor Okano, 1959
Macrauzata submontana Holloway, 1976

Undescribed species
Macrauzata hyalinata Inoue, 1993 [manuscript name]
Macrauzata limpidate Inoue, 1993 [manuscript name]

References

Drepaninae
Drepanidae genera
Taxa named by Arthur Gardiner Butler